The 2013 Korfball European Bowl was the qualifying competition for the 2014 European Korfball Championship, split into two divisions: Central, in Prievidza (Slovakia), and Eastern, in Papendrecht (Netherlands). 3 best teams of each division will join the 10 qualified-teams-by-ranking for competing in the European Championship.

Central division
The Central Division took place in Prievidza (Slovakia) from 8 to 9 June and the winners were Slovakia. Serbia and Scotland were qualified for European Championships too.

Central division final standings

Eastern division
The Eastern Division took place in Papendrecht (Netherlands) from 18 to 19 October, and the winners were Turkey. Wales and Ireland were the other teams qualified for the European Championship.

First round

Final round
5th-6th

Finals

Eastern division final standings

References

External links

Korfball European Bowl
Sport in Papendrecht
Sports competitions in South Holland
2013 in Dutch sport